Porphyrellus is a genus of fungi of the family Boletaceae.

Species

References

External links

Boletaceae